Acraea brainei, the Braine's acraea, is a butterfly in the family Nymphalidae. It is found in north-western Namibia.

Biology
The habitat consists of granite outcrops on hills and ridges.

Both sexes feed from the flowers of Turnera oculata. They are on wing from February to April.

The larvae also feed on Turnera oculata.

Taxonomy
It is a member of the Acraea terpsicore  species group   -   but see also Pierre & Bernaud, 2014

References

Butterflies described in 1986
brainei
Endemic fauna of Namibia
Butterflies of Africa